Improbable Worlds Limited (commonly referred to as Improbable) is a multinational technology company founded in 2012 and headquartered in London, England. It makes metaverse infrastructure and applications, as well as simulation software for video games and corporate use.

History

2012-2015 
Co-founders Herman Narula and Rob Whitehead both studied computer science degrees at Cambridge University, at Girton and Robinson Colleges respectively. They met at Cambridge Computer Labs in the months leading up to Narula's graduation; Narula was specialising in computer vision and Whitehead in graphics. The third co-founder Peter Lipka was a student at Imperial College, London before taking a job as a developer for Goldman Sachs. Narula and Whitehead shared a childhood love of video games, with Whitehead boosting his student income by making and selling weapons in Second Life. The three founders would go on to become Improbable's CEO, Chief Product Officer and Chief Operating Officer/Asian CEO respectively.

The firm's initial vision was of a product to help smaller video game development teams create massive simulations (or “virtual worlds”) at far greater scale and complexity. This culminated in SpatialOS, a distributed operating system for massive-scale simulations which integrated with major game engines.

Initially the business was run from Narula's parents' Hertfordshire house, Hyver Hall, through to the end of 2013, with Whitehead moving into the Narula family home. Seed funding came from a $1m Narula family loan and $1.2m from angel investors. Early-stage funders included the Wired journalist David Rowan (the first outside investor), UK VCs Saul and Robin Klein, Acorn Computer co-founder Hermann Hauser, Jawbone co-founder Alex Asseily, Skype co-founder Jaan Tallinn, Transferwise founder Taavet Hinrikus, Amadeus Capital Partners, Conversion Capital and UK tech investor Marcus Exall.

In March 2015 the firm received a $20m Series A investment from Andreessen Horowitz, with Chris Dixon taking a board seat. Other series A investors included Horizons Ventures and Temasek.

The firm partnered with Google in December 2016. SpatialOS was released into open beta in February 2017. The first games built on the technology were Worlds Adrift by Bossa Studios, Lazarus by Spilt Milk Studio and Fall Guys by Mediatonic.

2016-2019 
In 2016 Improbable won a multi-year contract with the US Army to provide war-gaming simulations.

In May 2017 Improbable received $502m in a round of Series B funding, led by SoftBank. At the time, it was the largest ever VC investment in a European technology firm. Softbank's investment was non-controlling, although its managing partner Deep Nishar joined Improbable's board. Andreessen Horowitz and Horizons Ventures made follow-on investments in the same round. Improbable recorded revenue of £7.9m for the 12 months to May 2017, most of which arose from its 2016 US Army deal. In the same year, the firm also received £876,960 funding from Innovate UK.

In 2018, Improbable raised $100m from Chinese internet group NetEase, valuing the firm in excess of $2bn. It also founded an office in Edmonton, Canada, with BioWare's Aaryn Flynn joining as manager for North America.

In 2019 Improbable signed an £11.5m contract with UK Strategic Command and a £2.3m contract with the British Army. In the same year, the firm underwent a terms of service dispute with Unity Technologies, the latter blocking several SpatialOS games. Improbable partnered with Epic Games (makers of the competing Unreal Engine) to create a US$25 million assistance fund to help developers affected by the dispute, which has since been resolved.

Between 2018 and 2020 Improbable made three acquisitions, buying German cloud computing firm Zeuz, American developer Midwinter Entertainment and the UK games company The Multiplayer Guys.

2020-present 
In 2020, Army Technology magazine reported that Improbable had entered a global partnership with Microsoft in the defence and national security sector, with Improbable's synthetic environment platform being deployed with Microsoft's Azure application management service to assist governments with operational planning, policy design, collective training, national resilience and defence experimentation.

In January 2022, Narula emphasised the company’s pivot to metaverse applications, adding that the firm required no additional investment to become profitable.

Improbable sold its majority stake in Inflexion Games to Tencent in February 2022.

In April 2022 Improbable announced M², a separate entity set up to develop a network of interoperable Web3 metaverses based on the company’s Project Morpheus technology. M² was announced in a $150m funding round led by Andreessen Horowitz and SoftBank's Vision Fund 2. Additional backers included crypto-native investors such as Digital Currency Group, Ethereal Ventures and CMT. M2’s first announced project is for The Otherside, a metaverse now under development by Yuga Labs, creators of the Bored Ape Yacht Club series of NFTs.

In October 2022 the company began closing a £100m funding round led by the blockchain company Elrond and valuing Improbable at over $3bn. The Financial Times reported that Improbable expects to reach operating profitability in 2023, following a tripling of revenue to more than $100m in 2022.

Products and services

Metaverse infrastructure and experiences

Project Morpheus 
In October 2021 Improbable revealed Project Morpheus, a series of ongoing software projects allowing mass scale during gameplay and lower operating costs for massively multiplayer online games and simulations, including esports stadia and virtual concerts in addition to gaming. In January 2022 Venturebeat reported that Improbable had commissioned research into the likely development of the metaverse. The attitudinal study was carried out among 2000 gamers and 800 game developers. Respondents believed that the metaverse was a logical progression of gaming, with over 90% of American and British gamers believing the metaverse will be populated and accessible in the next ten years; 10% of British gamers thought the metaverse would arrive by 2023.

M² 
In April 2022, Improbable announced M² (pronounced “M-Squared”), a network of interoperable Web 3 metaverses based on Project Morpheus. Narula has described the M² network as “...an internet of metaverses”. M² is intended to enable scale and interoperability between metaverses on the M² network, allowing game developers to create virtual assets such NFTs and other digital objects, and for users to transport these digital assets between worlds. M² metaverses will feature decentralised, blockchain-enabled web 3 governance principles, where network communities vote on network decisions. In May 2022 M2 announced that it would help build and operate The Otherside, a gamified metaverse in which users can turn their NFTs into playable characters and assets; these assets will port to other metaverses on the M2 network.

Gaming 
Improbable has a portfolio of technology and services to develop and operate various third-party and in-house multiplayer games. This includes an experimental version of Midwinter's Scavengers using Morpheus, which can accommodate 10,000 players simultaneously.

Defense 
Improbable develops large-scale real-life simulation platforms for governments and defense, including for the US Department of Defense and the UK Ministry of Defence. Its software allows, for example, troops to understand battlefield interactions with multiple simulated participants, using real-world data on weather, geography and recent warfare.

In June 2022 Improbable officially launched Myridian, a collaboration platform for modelling and simulation research, alongside the Universities of Oxford, Bristol, Leeds, Manchester and Durham, among other institutions. The initiative aims to help governments exploit advances in computational modelling and simulation, data analytics, AI and machine learning. In the same month Improbable announced Skyral, a development platform for synthetic environments in the defence sector.

List of games 
 Ion (TBA, for Microsoft Windows and Xbox One) - Cancelled in 2016
 Worlds Adrift (2017 for Microsoft Windows) - Cancelled in 2019
 Mavericks: Proving Grounds (2018 for Microsoft Windows) - Cancelled in 2019
 Seed (TBA, for Microsoft Windows)
 Lazarus (2018, for Microsoft Windows) - Cancelled in 2019
 Scavengers (TBA, for Microsoft Windows, PlayStation 4 and Xbox One.) 
 Nightingale (TBA, for PC)

References

British companies established in 2012
Companies based in London
Video game companies of the United Kingdom
Virtual reality companies